Jack Leo Benjamin Davies (born 30 March 2000) is an English cricketer. He made his first-class debut on 15 August 2020, for Middlesex in the 2020 Bob Willis Trophy. Prior to his first-class debut, he was named in England's squad for the 2018 Under-19 Cricket World Cup. He made his Twenty20 debut on 5 September 2020, for Middlesex in the 2020 t20 Blast. He made his List A debut on 25 July 2021, for Middlesex in the 2021 Royal London One-Day Cup.

References

External links
 

2000 births
Living people
Berkshire cricketers
English cricketers
Middlesex cricketers